Kūshankū (クーシャンク, 公相君) also called Kūsankū (クーサンクー), Kōsōkun or Kankū-dai (観空大), is an open hand karate kata that is studied by many practitioners of Okinawan Karate, specifically styles related to Shuri-te. In many styles, such as Shotokan, there are two versions of the kata: Kūsankū-shō and Kūsankū-dai. The name Kūsankū or Kōsōkun (公相君) is used in Okinawan systems of karate, and refers to Kūsankū, a Chinese diplomat from Fukien who traveled to Okinawa in the 1700s. In Japanese systems of karate, the kata has been known as Kankū (translated as gazing heavenward, viewing the sky, or contemplating the sky) ever since it was renamed in the 1930s by Funakoshi Gichin. This kata is also practiced in Tang Soo Do as Kong Sang Koon in Korean according to the hangul rendering of the hanja . Most schools of Tang Soo Do only practice the "Dai" version but a handful do practice both the latter and "Sho" versions.

Overview
Kūsankū is a cornerstone of many styles of karate.  It is characterized by the use of flowing techniques that resemble those found in White Crane Kung Fu; it also has a wide variety of open-handed techniques.  In Matsubayashi-ryu karate, the kata is known for its flying kick and its "cheating" stance, which robs the opponent of opportunities to attack by extending one leg along the ground and squatting as low as possible on the other (ura-gamae). One possible bunkai for this technique allows the practitioner to escape a bear-hug from behind by twisting and dropping out of their grasp. The hand techniques that accompany the stance block the head, while allowing for a strike to the groin, knee, or foot. Because of the complexity of its techniques, Kūsankū is the highest ranking and most complex kata in Matsubayashi-ryū, and is said to take more than ten years to master.

In Shotokan karate, Kankū-dai consists of 65 movements executed in about 90 seconds. It is a major form of the kata; its equivalent minor form is called Kankū-shō. Kankū-dai was one of Gichin Funakoshi's favorite kata and is a representative kata of the Shōtōkan system. The embusen (path of movement) of Kankū-shō is similar to that of Kankū-dai, but it begins differently. It is a compulsory Shōtōkan kata and of high technical merit.  As a result of Anko Itosu's efforts, the Heian kata contain sequences taken from Kankū-dai.

References

External links
Shotokan Kanku dai site

See also
Kusanku Sai in Isshin-ryū
Karate kata
Kata

Karate kata